Philippe Hurault de Cheverny (1579–1620), a bishop of Chartres. He was a son of Philippe Hurault de Cheverny, a  chancellor of France. He was a bibliophile and book collector. He was also abbot in commendam of the Abbey of Saint-Père-en-Vallée.

See also
Catholic Church in France

References

17th-century French people
Bishops of Chartres
1579 births
1620 deaths